This is a list of members of the Western Australian Legislative Council from 22 May 1910 to 21 May 1912. The chamber had 30 seats made up of ten provinces each electing three members, on a system of rotation whereby one-third of the members would retire at each biennial election. Prior to the 1910 election, the Council had thought of itself as entirely independent from party politics, but with the election of Labor members to the Council and Labor's vigorous (and ultimately successful) campaign at the 1911 election for the Legislative Assembly, many of its members joined the newly formed Liberal Party which had emerged from the various National Political Leagues and Liberal Leagues.

Notes
 On 1 March 1910, Metropolitan-Suburban Province MLC Walter Kingsmill resigned to contest a Senate seat in the federal election, and Douglas Gawler won the regular election for the seat on 23 March. Walter Kingsmill was subsequently elected at the regular Council election to a Metropolitan Province seat.
 On 2 September 1910, East Province MLC George Throssell died. Warren Marwick won the resulting by-election on 26 September 1910.
 On 22 September 1911, Metropolitan-Suburban Province MLC Sydney Stubbs resigned to contest the Assembly seat of Wagin, which he went on to represent until 1947, and Joseph Langsford resigned to contest the Assembly seat of Claremont. Labor candidates Frederick Davis and James Doland respectively won the resulting by-elections on 2 November 1911.
 On 7 October 1911, Central Province MLC John Drew was appointed Colonial Secretary in the new Ministry led by John Scaddan. He was therefore required to resign and contest a ministerial by-election, at which he was returned unopposed on 17 October 1910.

Sources
 
 
 

Members of Western Australian parliaments by term